Shree Swasthani is a Hindu goddess (Parameshwari) and is responsible for the good fortune, welfare and Power. She is mostly worshipped in Nepal in the holy month from poush Shukla purnima to magh Shukla purnima with dedicated rituals. Following such ritutals within this holy month brought many wishes to be fruitful for many. Through the reciting of story, we can find out the changes in fate provided by Goddess in the lives of several persons. But there are moluch more people who worships and have been satisfied by her blessings. She is a mother who loves you so much that, she will not take you go wrong path no matter the steps she takes for so. She is the creator of this universe.

Original Newa version
The original Newa version is very different from Swasthani written in Nepali language. People in the town of Sakwo have handwritten documents of Swasthani in the Nepal Bhasa.

Swasthani Brata Katha

Swasthani Brata Katha is a Hindu tale recited every day for a month, which mostly falls in January and February. The book has 31 chapters which tell the story of life of various gods and goddesses.
The story of goddess Swasthani and Shiva is mainly focussed, Swasthani is the Hindu deity known for miraculously granting wishes made in a solemn state by the pure. The sacred book was originated in the Kathmandu Valley. It is read mostly by Nepali Hindus in comparison with those from India.
This book's story was derived from Skanda Purana.

Festival
The festival usually begins from the full moon day in the Pohela month of Nepal Era which is Poush month of Bikram Sambat, normally from January to February, and will end on the next full moon day.  Every night family members gather around, recite one chapter of the story each day till the 31st day in almost every Nepali family. 
This month-long festival is marked by fasting especially by women including few men the entire month for the sake of family welfare or getting a good husband or wife. 
The festival conclude with an Ashwamegha Yagya, devotees worship god Shiva for whole night.

When the festival concludes next month, various types of food are prepared to mark the end of the day and it is believed that every thing has to be 108 pieces even the flowers.
Of the 108 pieces, eight are to be given to the husbands, if there is no husband then to son, and if no son then to the son of a friend, and if no friend then the fasting lady has to formally release it on the nearby river.

The festival is in fact not a festival. It is a ritual of fasting for 30 days. It is called 'apsan chonegu' in the local Nepal Bhasa and 'brata' in Nepali. Fasting is voluntary for those interested undertake this month-long brata. Traditionally, the locals of Swaniga - Kathmandu Valley - observed this brata. Swaniga refers to the local villages, towns and cities like Sakwo(Sankhu), Khwopa (Bhaktapur), Yala, (Patan), Yen (Kathmandu), Bhondesh -Bhotan (Banepa), Palanti (Panauti), Phampi (Pharpin), and other Newar localities. Especially people from certain castes of Newars took this brata.

In the present day context, the devotees are not limited to Newar people only. There are devotees from all over the country and all the Hindu castes. The devotees from Brahmin and Chhetri communities are increasing year by year. During the Brata, God Madhavnarayan is worshipped. It seems that the brata is a blend of Shaivism and Vaishnavism. Madhavnarayan is the name of the lord Vishnu in the month Magh since the lord Vishnu is worshipped by different names in each of the 12 different months.

References

Hindu literature
Hindu goddesses